Melica stuckertii, is a grass species in the family Poaceae that is endemic to Argentina and southern South America.

Description
The species is perennial and have short rhizomes. Both panicle axis and branches are scaberulous with solitary spikelets. They carry 1 fertile floret with it callus being glabrous. Fertile spikelets are pediceled, the pedicels of which are curved, ciliate, hairy, and filiform. Florets are diminished at the apex.

Its lemma have ciliated margins that have a hairy middle. It sterile lemma though is truncate. The glumes are all keelless but are different in size and texture. Lower glume also have an acute apex while the upper one have an obtuse one. The upper glumes have asperulous surface as well. It also have ciliolate keels with fleshy, oblong, and truncate flowers that have 2 lodicules, and grow together.

References

serrana
Endemic flora of Argentina
Flora of South America
Taxa named by Eduard Hackel